Egyptian–Ottoman War may refer to:
 Ottoman–Mamluk War (1485–91)
 Ottoman–Mamluk War (1516–17)
 Egyptian–Ottoman War (1831–33)
 Egyptian–Ottoman War (1839–41)